Heterometrus laoticus or Vietnam forest scorpion, is a scorpion species found in peaty areas of Vietnam and Laos. They are a communal species, but cannibalism has been known to occur, and if caught, they can be extremely violent even towards their own kind.

Lethality
Rather than being a lethal toxin, the giant scorpion's venom is paralytic. The venom is distilled into medicines against various kinds of microorganisms. It exhibits good results in disc diffusion assay for Bacillus subtilis, Klebsiella pneumoniae, Pseudomonas aeruginosa, and Staphylococcus aureus, among others.

As food
The scorpion is farmed for consumption as a novelty food in Vietnam. They are also used to make snake wine (scorpion wine).

References

External links

Scorpionidae
Animals described in 1981
Arthropods of Laos
Invertebrates of Vietnam